Rhytisma ulmi is a species of fungus commonly found on elms in North America

References

External links

Leotiomycetes